Darreh-ye Khalk is a village in Saroleh Rural District, Meydavud District, Bagh-e Malek County, Khuzestan Province, Iran. At the 2006 census, its population was 16, in 4 families.

References 

Populated places in Bagh-e Malek County